Karaçal can refer to:

 Karaçal, Alaca
 Karaçal, Burdur
 Karaçal Dam